Marina Fatima Confait is a Seychellois retired civil servant. She served as Vice-Chancellor of the University of Seychelles from March 2012 to February 2014, and as Principal Secretary of the Ministry of Foreign Affairs from 2019 to 2021.

Biography 
Confait's first role was in January 1977 as a secondary school teacher. She went on to work in a variety of ministries. She also served as Chief Executive Officer of the National Human Resources Development Council (NHRDC). She studied at the Katholieke Universiteit Brussel, completing her degree in 1997.

In March 2012, she was appointed as Vice-Chancellor of the University of Seychelles. In February 2014, she resigned to pursue her PhD at Edith Cowan University, graduating in 2018.

In February 2019, Confait became the Principal Secretary in the Ministry of Foreign Affairs. She continued in this position until her retirement in 2021.

References 

Living people
University of Seychelles
Women heads of universities and colleges
Edith Cowan University alumni
Year of birth missing (living people)